Samoa is an overwhelmingly Christian majority country, with adherents of Islam being a minuscule minority.

History
The introduction of Islam into the country began in the mid 1980s when the Saudi Arabia-based World Assembly of Muslim Youth and Malaysia-based Regional Islamic Da'wah Council of Southeast Asia and the Pacific began their dawah activities in Pacific countries.

Mosque
There is one mosque in the country, located in the village of Vaiusu.

Demographics
During the 2001 census, Muslims accounted for 0.03% of the population. The Western Samoa Muslim League is the Islamic organisation in the country which was established in 1986.

See also
 Religion in Samoa
 Islam in American Samoa

References

Samoa
Samoa
Religion in Samoa